Another Round at the Spaceport Bar is an anthology of science fiction club tales edited by George H. Scithers and Darrell Schweitzer. It was first published in paperback by Avon Books in April 1989. The first British edition was issued in paperback by New English Library in January 1992.

Summary
The book collects eighteen novelettes and short stories by various science fiction authors, with an introduction by W. T. Quick.

Contents
"Introduction: 'In Vino Veritas?'" (W. T. Quick)
"The Far King" (Richard Wilson)
"The Altar at Midnight" (C. M. Kornbluth)
"Princess" (Morgan Llywelyn)
"The Subject Is Closed" (Larry Niven)
"The Persecutor's Tale" (John M. Ford)
"Longshot" (Jack C. Haldeman II)
"Finnegan's" (W. T. Quick)
"The Oldest Soldier" (Fritz Leiber)
"The Ultimate Crime" (Isaac Asimov)
"—All You Zombies—" (Robert A. Heinlein)
"The Immortal Bard" (Isaac Asimov)
"Anyone Here from Utah?" (Michael Swanwick)
"Cold Victory" (Poul Anderson)
"C.O.D." (Jonathan Milos)
"Pennies from Hell" (Darrell Schweitzer)
"Not Polluted Enough" (George H. Scithers)
"Well Bottled at Slab's" (John Gregory Betancourt)
"The Three Sailors' Gambit" (Lord Dunsany)

Reception
The anthology was reviewed by Brian Magorrian in Paperback Inferno no. 78, 1989, Jon Wallace in Paperback Inferno no. 95, 1992, and Keith Freeman in Vector no. 166, 1992.

Notes

1989 anthologies
Science fiction anthologies
Darrell Schweitzer anthologies
Avon (publisher) books